Brambach is a surname of:

 Wilhelm Brambach (17 December 1841 – 26 February 1932), German classical scholar, music historian, and librarian
 Martin Brambach (born 1967), German actor
 Caspar Joseph Brambach (14 July 1833 – 20 June 1902), 19th-century German musician, pedagogue and composer 

German toponymic surnames